Mitford and Launditch Rural District was a rural district in Norfolk, England from 1894 to 1974.

It was formed under the Local Government Act 1894 based on the Mitford and Launditch rural sanitary district, taking its name from the two ancient hundreds of Mitford and Launditch. It completely encircled East Dereham Urban District.

The district was abolished under the Local Government Act 1972 and became part of the Breckland district. Its boundaries never changed during its 80 year existence.

Statistics

Parishes

References

Districts of England created by the Local Government Act 1894
Districts of England abolished by the Local Government Act 1972
Historical districts of Norfolk
Rural districts of England